Fauser is a German surname. Notable people with the surname include:

Gerrit Fauser (born 1989), German professional ice hockey player
Jörg Fauser (1944–1987), German writer, poet and journalist
Mark Fauser, American actor, director, screenwriter, and producer

References

German-language surnames